Uma Sundari is a 1956 Indian Telugu-language film, produced by M. Somasundaram under the Jupiter Pictures Pvt. Ltd. banner and directed by P. Pullayya. It stars N. T. Rama Rao and Sriranjani Jr., with music composed by Ashwathama.

Plot
Once upon a time, there was a kingdom named Mahendrapura. It's king, Rajashekara (V. Nagayya), loves his sister Uma Sundari (Sriranjani Jr) more than his life. Queen Neelaveni (Kannamba) aspires to marry Uma Sundari with her retarded brother Alankar Bhoopati (Relangi), to which Uma refuses and marries her love interest Vijaya Rayalu, the King of Rayadurgam. Offended, Neelaveni keeps a grudge against her and wants to take revenge. Time passes, and Uma Sundari is blessed with seven children. Meanwhile, Rayadurgam is continuously hit with severe droughts and the kingdom is almost on the edge to collapse. Uma Sundari seeks her brother's help but Neelaveni prevents the attempts. The Rayadurgam people blame Uma Sundari for the deed, and Uma moves to Mahendrapuram along with her children. At the same time, Rajashekara learns about his sister's situation and starts for Rajadurgam. Humiliated, Vijaya Rayulu accuses Rajashekara and leaves the fort. At Mahendrapuram, Neelaveni scorns Uma Sundari when Uma Sundari drowns her children in a well, out of hunger and anguish. After returning, Rajashekara realizes the evil play of Neelaveni, and when he is about to slaughter her, she commits suicide. At the same time, Vijaya Rayalu loses his consciousness and becomes a wanderer when Shiva (Nagabhushanam) appears in the form of a beggar, guides him to reach his wife, and gives back their children and kingdom.

Cast
N. T. Rama Rao as Vijaya Rayalu
Sriranjani Jr. as Uma Sundari
V. Nagayya as Raja Shekarudu
Relangi as Alamkara Bhupathi
Nagabhushanam as Shiva
Vangara
Peketi Sivaram
Kannamba as Neelaveni 
Surabhi Balasaraswathi

Soundtrack

Music composed by Ashwathama. Lyrics were written by Vempati Sadasivabrahmam.

References

External links 

 

1950s Telugu-language films
1956 films
Indian drama films
Films scored by Ashwatthama
1956 drama films